Ben Haim, also transliterated as Ben Hayim or Ben-Chaim, is a Hebrew surname meaning "son of life" . Notable people with the surname include:

 (born 1968), Israeli journalist
 Baruch Ben Haim (1921–2005), American rabbi
 Eliyahu Ben Haim (born 1940), American rabbi
 Paul Ben-Haim (1897–1984), Israeli composer
 Tal Ben Haim (born 1982), Israeli footballer
 Tal Ben Haim (footballer, born 1989), Israeli footballer

Hebrew-language surnames
Jewish surnames